Mwanalima Adam Jereko (born 4 September 1997), known as Mwanalima Adam, is a Kenyan footballer who plays as a forward in the Turkish Women's Super League for Hakkarigücü Spor ,and the Kenya women's national team.

Club career 
By December 2021, Adam moved to Turkey and signed with Hakkarigücü Spor to play in the 2021–22 Turkish Super League. She scored her first professional hat-trick on 2 April 2022 in a 6–0 win over Dudullu, taking her tally to the season to 11 goals in the first 17 games.

International career 
Adam capped for Kenya at senior level during the 2018 Africa Women Cup of Nations qualification.

See also 
List of Kenya women's international footballers

References

External links

1997 births
Living people
Kenyan women's footballers
Kenya women's international footballers
Women's association football forwards
Kenyan expatriate footballers
Expatriate women's footballers in Turkey
Kenyan expatriate sportspeople in Turkey
Hakkarigücü Spor players
Turkish Women's Football Super League players